Igor Vladimirovich Ignatov (born 12 September 1970) is a former Russian football player.

Club career
He played for SC Tavriya Simferopol in the Ukrainian Cup.

He made his Russian Premier League debut for FC Uralmash Yekaterinburg on 7 April 1993 in a game against FC Dynamo Moscow. That was his only season in the top tier.

References

1970 births
Living people
People from Sverdlovsk Oblast
Soviet footballers
FC Ural Yekaterinburg players
FC Uralets Nizhny Tagil players
FC Neftyanik Ufa players
Russian footballers
SC Tavriya Simferopol players
Russian expatriate footballers
Expatriate footballers in Ukraine
Russian Premier League players
Association football forwards
Sportspeople from Sverdlovsk Oblast